Anisocarpus is a genus of flowering plants in the tribe Madieae within the family Asteraceae.

 Species
 Anisocarpus madioides Nutt. - California, Oregon, Washington, British Columbia.
 Anisocarpus scabridus (Eastw.) B.G.Baldwin - northern California.

 formerly included
 Anisocarpus bolanderi A.Gray - Kyhosia bolanderi (A.Gray) B.G.Baldwin.
 Anisocarpus radiatus (Kellogg) Greene - Madia radiata Kellogg.
 Anisocarpus rammii (Greene) Greene - Jensia rammii (Greene) B.G.Baldwin.
 Anisocarpus yosemitanus (Parry ex A.Gray) Greene -  Jensia yosemitana (Parry ex A.Gray) B.G.Baldwin.

References

Madieae
Asteraceae genera